Major-General Ernest Wright Alexander,  (2 October 1870 – 25 August 1934) was a British Army officer and an English recipient of the Victoria Cross, the highest award for gallantry in the face of the enemy that can be awarded to British and Commonwealth forces.

Military career
Alexander was trained at the Royal Military College, Sandhurst and commissioned into the Royal Field Artillery as a second lieutenant on 27 July 1889. He was promoted to lieutenant on 27 July 1892, and to captain on 26 December 1899.

Action at Elouges
At the age of 43, as a major in the 119th Battery Royal Field Artillery during the First World War, he was awarded the Victoria Cross for gallantry. On 24 August 1914, during the action of Elouges in Belgium, when the flank guard was attacked by a German corps, Alexander handled his battery against overwhelming odds with such conspicuous success that all his guns were saved notwithstanding that they had to be withdrawn by hand by himself and volunteers led by a Captain (Francis Octavus Grenfell) of the 9th Lancers. This enabled the retirement of the 5th Division to be carried out without serious loss. Subsequently, Major Alexander rescued a wounded man under heavy fire.

He later attained the rank of major general. His medal group is on display at the Ashcroft Gallery in the Imperial War Museum, London.

Death
Alexander died in his 64th year on 25 August 1934 at Kingsbridge, Devon, his body was buried at Putney Vale Cemetery.

References

Further reading
Irish Winners of the Victoria Cross (Richard Doherty & David Truesdale, 2000)
Monuments to Courage (David Harvey, 1999)
The Register of the Victoria Cross (This England, 1997)
VCs of the First World War - 1914 (Gerald Gliddon, 1994)
Liverpool VCs (James Murphy, Pen and Sword Books, 2008)

External links
Liverpool Echo
'Burial location of Ernest Alexander' (S.W. London)
'Location of Ernest Alexander's Victoria Cross' (Sold at auction)''
Lot information from the auction

1870 births
1934 deaths
British Army major generals
British World War I recipients of the Victoria Cross
Royal Artillery officers
British Army generals of World War I
Burials at Putney Vale Cemetery
People educated at Harrow School
Victoria Cross awardees from Liverpool
Companions of the Order of St Michael and St George
Recipients of the Croix de Guerre 1914–1918 (France)
Companions of the Order of the Bath
Grand Officers of the Order of Aviz
Knights of the Military Order of Savoy
Graduates of the Royal Military College, Sandhurst
British Army recipients of the Victoria Cross